Diaphania holophaealis is a moth in the family Crambidae. It was described by George Hampson in 1900. It has been recorded from Christmas Island, 1,550 km northwest of  Australia.

References

Moths described in 1900
Diaphania